Tom Shea is an American football coach.  He is the special adviser to head football coach at Upper Iowa University in Fayette, Iowa, a position he had assumed following the 2019.  Shea served as the head football coach at Dakota State University in Madison, South Dakota from 1981 to 1983 and again from 2007 to 2008, Peru State College in Peru, Nebraska from 1986 to 1990, the University of Mary in Bismarck, North Dakota from 1991 to 1996, William Penn University in Oskaloosa, Iowa from 1999 to 2000, and Upper Iowa from 2009 to 2019, compiling career college football coaching record of 146–156–3.  His Peru State Bobcats won the NAIA Football Division II National Championship in 1990.

Head coaching record

References

External links
 Upper Iowa profile

Year of birth missing (living people)
Living people
Central Arkansas Bears football coaches
Dakota State Trojans football coaches
Mary Marauders football coaches
Peru State Bobcats football coaches
Upper Iowa Peacocks football coaches
William Penn Statesmen football coaches